Arnoldo is a masculine given name. It may also refer to:

Arnoldo Mondadori Editore, Italian publishing company 
Arnoldo's Ristorantino, 2021 Argentine children's television series